Glass Bead Games is a double album by jazz saxophonist Clifford Jordan which was recorded in 1973 and released on the Strata-East label. The album was re-released on CD as part of The Complete Clifford Jordan Strata-East Sessions by Mosaic Records in 2013.

Reception

The AllMusic review by Ken Dryden stated, "Clifford Jordan's two volumes of sessions under the title Glass Bead Games have long been heralded as some of the most important work of his career." Writing for All About Jazz, Samuel Chell enthused "To call the playing 'remarkable' is to do it an injustice: rather, it's exemplary as a record of one instance of tapping into and then realizing the potential of the vast energy field that is human consciousness."

Track listing
All compositions by Clifford Jordan except where noted.
 "Powerful Paul Robeson" – 5:42   
 "Glass Bead Games" – 4:36   
 "Prayer to the People" – 4:16   
 "Cal Massey" (Stanley Cowell) – 2:42   
 "John Coltrane" (Bill Lee, Clifton Lee) – 6:48   
 "Eddie Harris" (Lee) – 4:19   
 "Biskit" (Lee) – 5:28   
 "Shoulders" (Cedar Walton) – 5:19   
 "Bridgework" (Walton) – 3:47   
 "Maimoun" (Cowell) – 5:40   
 "Alias Buster Henry" – 8:16 (Billy Higgins)  
 "One for Amos" – 6:47 (Sam Jones)

Personnel
Clifford Jordan – tenor saxophone
Stanley Cowell (tracks 1, 4–7, 10 & 11), Cedar Walton (tracks 2, 3, 8, 9 & 12) – piano
Bill Lee (tracks 1, 4–7, 10 & 11), Sam Jones (tracks 2, 3, 8, 9 & 12) – bass 
Billy Higgins – drums, percussion

References

1974 albums
Clifford Jordan albums
Strata-East Records albums